Milton Livingstone Fredericks Jarvie,  (12 July 1891 – 31 January 1965) was an Australian politician, businessman and soldier.

Jarvie was born at Pyramul, south of Mudgee, New South Wales, to schoolteacher John Rose Shaw Jarvie and Jean Wade, née Fredericks. He attended Enmore High School and the University of Sydney, receiving a Diploma of Economics. Around 1914 he married Geraldine James. From 1915 to 1920 he served in the Australian Imperial Force's Provost Corps in the First World War, rising to the rank of major and being decorated with the Military Cross. For his later service with the Citizens Military Force, Jarvie received the Efficiency Decoration. After the war he became a business manager and an executive officer with the British Australasian Tobacco Company. In 1925 he was elected to Marrickville Council, on which he served until 1927 (he was also mayor in 1927).

In 1925, Jarvie was elected to the New South Wales Legislative Assembly as one of the Nationalist members for Western Suburbs. When single-member districts were re-introduced in 1927 he represented Ashfield, holding the seat until 1935, when he lost United Australia Party preselection. Jarvie contested the election unsuccessfully as an independent. From 1937 he was an executive officer with the Sound Proof Company, and during the Second World War he served as war area officer for Southern New South Wales. After the war (1945–47), he was director of the United Nations Relief and Rehabilitation Administration, Displaced Persons Camp in southern Austria. He married Helen Michell in 1949. Jarvie died in 1965 at Concord, New South Wales.

References

|-

1891 births
1965 deaths
20th-century Australian politicians
Australian Army officers
New South Wales local councillors
Australian military personnel of World War I
Australian Army personnel of World War II
Mayors of Marrickville
Members of the New South Wales Legislative Assembly
Nationalist Party of Australia members of the Parliament of New South Wales
Recipients of the Military Cross
United Australia Party members of the Parliament of New South Wales
University of Sydney alumni